Edwin Luntley (28 April 1857 – 1 August 1921) was an English international footballer, who played as a right back.

Career
Born in Croydon, Luntley played for Nottingham Forest from November 1878 to January 1883. He earned two caps for England in 1880.

References

1857 births
1921 deaths
English footballers
England international footballers
Nottingham Forest F.C. players
English Football League players
Association football fullbacks